Kingston Hall is a country house in Kingston on Soar, Nottinghamshire.

It was built between 1842 and 1846 to designs by the architect Edward Blore for Edward Strutt, 1st Baron Belper. It was made a Grade II listed building in 1987.

The grounds of Kingston Hall contains a Grade II listed Pavilion and a Grade II listed stable block.

In 1916 it was the birthplace of Lavinia Mary Strutt, (later Lavinia Fitzalan-Howard, Duchess of Norfolk), daughter of Algernon Strutt, 3rd Baron Belper and his wife, Eva Strutt.

It was subdivided into separate apartments in 1977.

References

Country houses in Nottinghamshire
Grade II listed buildings in Nottinghamshire
Edward Blore buildings